Canada competed at the 2017 World Championships in Athletics in London, United Kingdom, 4–13 August 2017.

On July 18, 2017, a team of 48 athletes was announced to represent the country at the championships. The team was later increased to 57 athletes after the IAAF issued invites to athletes to round out fields in each event.

2015 double bronze medallist and three time medallist at the 2016 Summer Olympics Andre de Grasse withdrew from the competition after tearing his hamstring in practice before the competition.

Qualification
To be selected to the team Canadian athletes had to meet the qualification standard and finish in the top at the 2017 Canadian. If an athlete achieves the standard and does not finish in the top two or receives an invite from the IAAF, selection to the team was up to the sole discretion of the National Team Committee. For the 10,000m, race walks and marathon the top 3 were selected from the various Canadian Championships of those events. These athletes also had to meet the qualification time/points total to be selected. If an athlete rejected a spot the next athlete (provided they met the standard) was awarded the spot up to a maximum of three.

Results

Men
Track and road events

Field events

Combined events – Decathlon

Women
Track and road events

Field events

References

Nations at the 2017 World Championships in Athletics
World Championships in Athletics
2017